Phthalide is an organic chemical compound with the molecular formula C8H6O2. It is a white solid and the simplest benzo lactone. It is prepared from hydroxymethylbenzoic acid.

Phthalides
The phthalide core is found a variety of more complex chemical compounds including dyes (such as phenolphthalein), fungicides (such as tetrachlorophthalide, often referred to simply as "phthalide"), and natural oils (such as butylphthalide).

Examples

References